Aldisa cooperi is a species of sea slug, a dorid nudibranch, a marine gastropod mollusc in the family Cadlinidae.

Distribution
This demersal nudibranch is found in cold to temperate waters, from the intertidal to subtidal zones (up to a depth of 20 m), along the Pacific coast of North America, from California to Alaska. It has also been reported from the coasts of Japan and Korea.

Description
Cooper's aldisa is a small dorid nudibranch, growing to a length of 25 mm. Its mantle has a yellow to orange color, with some black spots spread over it. It has a smooth body covered with sparse, low tubercles and gills clustered on the posterior part of its body. It lays its eggs in ribbons.

Conservation status
The vulnerability of this species is low to moderate, but it is not listed in the IUCN Red List.

Ecology
It is usually found nestled in its food sponge Anthoarcuata graciae. 
This sponge is currently classified as a member of the genus Antho, family Clathriidae, but may actually belong to the family Hymedesmiidae as other Aldisa species specialise on sponges from this family.

References

Cadlinidae
Gastropods described in 1972